Benjamín Rivera Jaramillo (born May 9, 1969) is a Mexican voice actor best known for voicing Fry in the Mexican/Latin American dub of Futurama. He is married to Fujiko Mine's Latin American voice actress Belinda Martinez. He is also known for voicing Richard Watterson from the Latin American Spanish dub of The Amazing World of Gumball.

Filmography
 Hoogi in Mixels (2014)
 Richard Watterson (Gumball's Dad) in The Amazing World of Gumball (2011) 
 Vega/Balrog in Street Fighter: The Legend of Chun-Li (2009)
 Ben Marshall in Driving Lessons (2006) (voice-over for Rupert Grint)
 Chamillionaire in "Ridin'" (2006)
 Ramón in $1 Money Wars (2006)
 Ramón in Da Capo of Love: Fujiko's Unlucky Days (2005)
 Sylvester in Trapped in the Closet (2005-) (voice-over for R. Kelly)
 Ramón in Memories of the Flame: Tokyo Crisis (2005)
 Ramón in Farewell to Nostradamus (2005)
  Furoi in Casshern (2005)
 Ramón in In Memory of the Walther P-38 (2005)
 Ramón in Lupin III: Dead or Alive (2005)
 Ramón in Burn, Zantetsuken! (2004)
 Ramón in Orders to Assassinate Lupin (2004)
 Ramón in Mystery of Mamo (2003)
 Ramón in The Pursuit of Harimao's Treasure (2002)
 Ramón in The Secret of Twilight Gemini (2002)
 Ramón in The Castle of Cagliostro (2002)
 Blind Mice #2 in Shrek (2001) (voiceover for Simon J. Smith)
 Fry in Futurama (1999–2006) (first voice)
 Benjamin "Benji" Price (Wakabayashi Genzo) and Tom Misaki (Misaki Taro) in Los Supercampeones: Oliver y Benji (1997–1998)
 Ramón in Bye Bye Liberty Crisis (1996)
 Asuma Shinohara in Patlabor (1996) and its movies (1995–2003)
 Tetsuo Shima in Akira (1995)
 Ramón in The Plot of the Fuma Clan (1994)
 Vega/Balrog in Street Fighter II: La Película (1994)
 Vega/Balrog in Street Fighter: La Ultíma Batalla (1994)
 Ramón in Lupin III (1994–1999)
 Ryoga Hibiki in Ranma ½ (1993–1995) and the movies (1994)
 Dying Lensman in Lensman (1990)
 Spearchucker Jones in M*A*S*H* (1984) (voice-over for Timothy Brown)
 Teniente Eduardo Traxler in Terminator (1984) (voice-over for Paul Winfield)
 Ponyboy Curtis in The Outsiders (1983) (voice-over for C. Thomas Howell)
 Terrell in Viaje a las Estrellas: La Ira de Khan (1982) (voice-over for Paul Winfield)
 Capitan Juan Wayne Warlock in Galaxy Express (1981)
 Spearchucker Jones in M*A*S*H* (1978) (voice-over for Fred Williamson)
 Tristan Taylor in Yu-Gi-Oh!
 Keigo Asano in Bleach
 Yashamaru in Naruto
 Petal in Kitty Is Not a Cat

References

Mexican male voice actors
Living people
1969 births